Rupert Walsh (born 14 May 1979 in Kill, County Kildare, Ireland) is an Irish former jockey. He is the second child, and eldest son, of former champion amateur jockey Ted Walsh and his wife Helen. Walsh is the third most prolific winner in British and Irish jump racing history behind only Sir Anthony McCoy and Richard Johnson.

Career
Showing talent from an early age, Walsh won the Irish amateur title twice, in 1996/97 (aged 18) and 1997/98, before turning professional. He won the English Grand National in 2000 at his first attempt, aged 20, on Papillon, a horse trained by his father and owned by Mrs J Maxwell Moran. Father and son then went on to win the Irish Grand National with Commanche Court the same year. In the 2004/05 season Walsh won three of the four Nationals: the Irish on the 2006 Grand National winner, Numbersixvalverde, the Welsh on subsequent 2007 Grand National winner Silver Birch, and the English on Hedgehunter. He rode Cornish Rebel in the Scottish, but was beaten a short head by Joe's Edge. However, he had earlier success in that race on Take Control in 2002 and following the retirement in 2015 of Tony McCoy, became the only jockey currently riding to have won all four Nationals.  Walsh has one of the best Grand National records amongst current jockeys having won the race twice (2000, 2005), finished second once (2006), third once (2009) and fourth twice (2001, 2002).

To date Walsh has ridden over 2500 winners including 59 winners at the Cheltenham Festival since his first win in 1998 on Alexander Banquet.  These include the 2004 Queen Mother Champion Chase on Azertyuiop, the 2007 and 2009 Cheltenham Gold Cup on the favourite, Kauto Star and two subsequent Queen Mother successes in 2008 and 2009 on the brilliant Master Minded. He also won both the 2006 Tingle Creek Chase and the King George VI Chase on Kauto Star. He repeated the King George feat, again on Kauto Star, in 2007 (just days after returning from injury), 2008 and 2009 when Kauto Star won impressively by 36 lengths.  He reclaimed the King George VI Chase in 2011 on board Kauto Star after Long Run won the race in 2010. He won the Hennessy Gold Cup twice, in 2003 on Strong Flow, and in more recent times, 2009 with Denman. He also won the Whitbread Gold Cup twice, in 2001 and 2003 (the latter when it was run as the Attheraces Gold Cup), both times on Ad Hoc. In 2007, Walsh won the inaugural British Horseracing Board Jockeys' Order of Merit award.

To date Walsh has been Irish jump jockey champion twelve times – 1998/99, 2000/01, 2004/05, 2005/06, 2006/07, 2007/08, 2008/09, 2009/10, 2013/14, 2014/15, 2015/16 and 2016/17.  Walsh's recent dominance of the jockeys' championship in Ireland is all the more remarkable given that for more than ten years he had a unique riding arrangement with two powerful stables, one on either side of the Irish Sea. Based in Calverstown, County Kildare, where he lives with his wife Gillian, he rides predominantly for Willie Mullins in Ireland. Formerly he also spent a substantial proportion of his time riding in England for Somerset-based champion trainer Paul Nicholls, the former trainer of Kauto Star. Walsh also takes the occasional ride for his father, Ted, and a variety of other Irish trainers.

In January 2007, Walsh achieved the fastest ever century of winners in Irish jumps racing history aboard Bluestone Lad at Gowran Park.  He ended the 2006/07 season with a combined total in Ireland and the UK of 198 winners, higher than any other jockey from either country that year.  (This total was later increased to 200 on the disqualification of two horses for positive tests to banned substances.  In both instances, Walsh had ridden the subsequently-promoted runners-up.) He repeated this feat in 2007/08, riding his 200th winner on Andreas at Sandown on his penultimate ride of the season. He rode his 1,000th Irish winner, Rare Article, at Sligo in May 2008.

At the 2009 Cheltenham Festival Walsh rode a record-breaking seven winners over the four days. He equalled that record at the 2016 Cheltenham Festival.  On the second day of the 2010 festival he rode Sanctuaire to victory in the Fred Winter Juvenile Novices Handicap Hurdle and therefore became the jockey with the most wins in the history of the Cheltenham festival.

In March 2011, Walsh rode Hurricane Fly to victory in the Champion Hurdle at Cheltenham, finishing ahead of Peddlers Cross and Oscar Whisky. It was Walsh's first victory in the feature race of the opening day at the Cheltenham Festival.

He won his 2,500 race on Au Quart De Tour at Gowran park on 20 January 2016.

As of 2019, Walsh is the Festival's most successful rider with 59 wins and has won the leading rider's award eleven times within the last fourteen years. In August 2015 Walsh won the Australian Grand National on Bashboy.			
			
On 1 May 2019, Walsh announced his retirement from racing with immediate effect after a career spanning 24 years. The announcement was made after he rode Kemboy to victory in the Punchestown Gold Cup. It was the 213th Grade One win for Walsh.

Statistics

He was the leading jockey at the Festival 11 times: 2004, 2006, 2008, 2009, 2010, 2011, 2013, 2014, 2015, 2016 and 2017.

Irish Jump Racing wins season by season

GB Jump Racing wins season by season

Injuries
Like many jump jockeys, Walsh has suffered a number of serious injuries, the worst of which was a broken leg sustained in 1999 at Pardubice in the Czech Republic, a course he was visiting to compete in the famous Great Pardubice Steeplechase. He later broke the same leg while schooling a horse and was out of action for a total of five months that season, but recovered in time to partner Papillon to win his first Grand National.

Walsh has also fractured his wrist twice, dislocated one hip and fractured the other, cracked his elbow, dislocated both shoulders and suffered cracked and badly bruised vertebrae. A fall at the Paddy Power meeting at Cheltenham in November 2008 resulted in Walsh having his spleen removed in an emergency operation. He returned to the saddle just 27 days later.

Walsh fractured his left ankle during a fall from the ill-fated Imperial Hills, trained by Willie Mullins at Killarney in May 2009. During his time off he was present to saddle Sesenta for Willie Mullins in the Ascot Stakes at Royal Ascot.

During the run-up to the 2010 Grand National he broke his left arm after a fall from Celestial Halo. His horse fell and they both seemed to have got away unscathed, but a horse racing behind them landed on his arm while he was on the ground, breaking it in two places.  Walsh suffered an injury in the same race in 2012 after a fall from Zarkander which ruled him out of the 2012 Grand National.

On the last day of the 2014 Cheltenham Festival Walsh sustained a compound fracture of the humerus in a fall in the Triumph Hurdle.

On the day before the 2016 Grand National Walsh fractured his wrist after falling in the Topham chase on Blood Cotil.

On 18 November 2017 Walsh fractured his right leg in a fall at Punchestown and did not return until 3 March 2018. On day two of the 2018 Cheltenham Festival Walsh aggravated his late 2017 injury.

Trainer split
In May 2013 it was announced that Walsh and Paul Nicholls were to split following Walsh's decision to spend more time in Ireland with his young family.  However they parted on good terms and Walsh has continued to ride the occasional Nicholls horse, including winning on Al Ferof in the Grade 2 Amlin Chase at Ascot in November 2014.

Personal life
Walsh married Gillian Doran in July 2006.  Their first child, Isabelle, was born in October 2009.  The couple have gone on to have three more daughters, Elsa, Gemma and Erica.

His sister Katie Walsh is also one of the top female jockeys.
His brother Ted Walsh Junior is married to female jockey Nina Carberry.

Popular culture
Walsh is mentioned in a song by the famous singer/songwriter Christy Moore called "The Ballad of Ruby Walsh," which appears on his album "Listen." The song is based on Christy's real life experience of watching the jockey at the Galway races.

Television
Walsh featured in a TG4 documentary called "Jump Boys". It followed the journeys of Walsh, Barry Geraghty and Davy Russell over the course of the 2011/12 season. It aired on 28 November 2012. He has also occasionally worked as a racing pundit for RTÉ while injured and has appeared on the Channel 4 Racing Saturday morning programme The Morning Line on a number of occasions. Walsh has also featured in a number of well received commercials for the bookmaker Paddy Power, in particular a recent commercial prior to the Cheltenham Festival 2016 where he confronts an angry Twitter Troll and allegations that jockeys intentionally throw themselves off their horses.

Major wins
 Ireland
 Irish Gold Cup       -(2)         Quel Esprit (2012), Bellshill (2019)
 Lexus Chase          -(3)         Rince Ri (2000), Denman (2007), Tidal Bay (2012)
 Punchestown Gold Cup -(7)         Imperial Call (1999), Commanche Court (2000), Neptune Collonges (2007, 2008), Boston Bob (2014), Kemboy (2019)
 Ladbrokes Champion Chase -(4)    Taranis (2007), Kauto Star (2008, 2010), Valseur Lido (2016)
 John Durkan Memorial Chase-(3)    Arvika Ligeonniere (2013), Djakadam (2015, 2016)
 Ryanair Gold Cup          -(3)    Rince Ri (1999), Big-and-Bold (2002), Voix Du Reve (2019)
 Drinmore Novice Chase     -(4)    Promalee (1998), Nil Desperandum (2003), Bog Warrior (2011), Arvika Ligeonniere (2012)
 Racing Post Novice Chase  -(1)    Min (2016)
 Fort Leney Novice Chase   -(1)    Back in Focus (2012)
 Paddy Power Dial-A-Bet Chase -(3) Papillon (1998, 2000), Douvan (2016)
 Arkle Novice Chase           -(3)  Assessed (2002), Un de Sceaux (2015), Douvan (2016)
 Dr P. J. Moriarty Novice Chase -(3)  J'y Vole (2008), Cooldine (2009), Ballycasey (2014)
 Ryanair Novice Chase          -(4) Le Roi Miguel (2003), Arvika Ligeonniere (2013), Un De Sceaux (2015), Douvan (2016)
 Punchestown Champion Chase    -(3) Micko's Dream (2001), Twist Magic (2008), Master Minded (2009)
 Morgiana Hurdle               -(6) Thousand Stars (2011), Hurricane Fly (2012, 2013, 2014), Nichols Canyon (2015, 2016)
 Royal Bond Novice Hurdle     -(4) Alexander Banquet (1998),  Sous les Cieux (2011), Long Dog (2015), Quick Grabim (2018)
 Hatton's Grace Hurdle         -(2) Zaidpour (2012), Arctic Fire (2015)
 Future Champions Novice Hurdle-(2) Solerina (2002), Long Dog (2015)
 Christmas Hurdle    -(3) Commanche Court (1998), Zaidpour (2013),Vroum Vroum Mag (2016)
 December Festival Hurdle      -(4) Hurricane Fly (2012, 2013, 2014), Nichols Canyon (2015) 
 Slaney Novice Hurdle          -(4) Homer Wells (2005), Mikael D'haguenet (2009), Briar Hill (2014), Bellshill (2016)
 Irish Champion Hurdle        -(6) Brave Inca (2009), Hurricane Fly (2012, 2013, 2014, 2015), Faugheen (2016) 
 Deloitte Novice Hurdle        -(3) Alexander Banquet (1999), Vautour (2014), Nichols Canyon (2015)
 Mares Novice Hurdle Championship Final           -(2) Nobody Told Me (2003), Annie Power (2013)
 Herald Champion Novice Hurdle -(4) Iktitaf (2006), Hurricane Fly (2009), Faugheen (2014), Douvan (2015)
 Champion Stayers Hurdle       -(5) Asian Maze (2006), Fiveforthree (2009), Quevega (2011, 2012, 2013)
 Punchestown Champion Hurdle   -(6) Davenport Milenium (2002), Hurricane Fly (2011, 2012, 2013), Faugheen (2015), Vroum Vroum Mag (2016)
 Tattersalls Ireland Champion Novice Hurdle    -(8) Davenport Milenium (2002), Nobody Told Me (2003), Sadlers Wings (2004), Nicanor (2006), Glencove Marina (2007), Mikael d'Haguenet (2009), Vautour (2014), Nichols Canyon (2015)
Champion Four Year Old Hurdle  -(5) Holy Orders (2001), Sporazene (2003), Diakali (2013), Abbyssial (2014), Bapaume (2017)
Irish Daily Mirror Novice Hurdle -(1) Bellshill (2016)
Mares Champion Hurdle          -(2)  Annie Power (2014, 2015)

 Great Britain
Betfair Chase                  -(4) Kauto Star (2006, 2009, 2011), Silviniaco Conti (2012)
Henry VIII Novices' Chase      -(2) Thisthatandtother (2003), Al Ferof (2011)
Tingle Creek Chase             -(3) Cenkos (2002), Kauto Star (2006), Un de Sceaux (2016) 
Long Walk Hurdle               -(2) Big Buck's (2009, 2011), 
Kauto Star Novices' Chase      -(2) Strong Flow (2003), Breedsbreeze (2008), 
Christmas Hurdle               -(3) Feathard Lady (2005), Faugheen (2014, 2015)
King George VI Chase           -(5) Kauto Star (2006, 2007, 2008, 2009, 2011)
Challow Novices' Hurdle        -(2) Cornish Rebel (2003), Denman (2006)
Tolworth Hurdle                -(3) Silverburn (2007), Breedsbreeze (2008), Yorkhill (2016)
Clarence House Chase           -(4) Master Minded (2009), Twist Magic (2010) Un de Sceaux (2016, 2017) 
Scilly Isles Novices' Chase    -(2) New Little Bric (2007), Herecomesthetruth (2009)
Ascot Chase                    -(1) Kauto Star (2008)
Top Novices' Hurdle            -(1) Pierrot Lunaire (2008)
Manifesto Novices' Chase       -(1) Clarcam (2015)
Anniversary 4-Y-O Novices' Hurdle          -(2) Le Duc (2003), Zarkandar (2011)
Betway Bowl                    -(2) What a Friend (2010), Kemboy (2019)
Aintree Hurdle                 -(5) Ilnamar (2002), Sacundai (2003), Asian Maze (2006), Zarkandar (2013), Annie Power (2016)
Mildmay Novices' Chase         -(2) Big Buck's (2008), Silviniaco Conti (2012)
Mersey Novices' Hurdle         -(4) Garde Champetre (2004), Natal (2006), Elusive Dream (2008), Nichols Canyon (2015)
Melling Chase                  -(3) Fadalko (2001), Master Minded (2011), Min (2019)
Sefton Novices' Hurdle         -(1) Asian Maze (2005)
Liverpool Hurdle               -(4) Big Buck's (2009, 2010, 2011, 2012) 
Maghull Novices' Chase         -(3) Le Roi Miguel (2003), Twist Magic (2007), Tataniano (2010)
Celebration Chase              -(2) Andreas (2008), Twist Magic (2009)

 France
 Grande Course de Haies d'Auteuil -(2) Thousand Stars (2011, 2012)
 Prix Alain du Breil             -(3) Strangely Brown (2005), Diakali (2013), Footpad (2016)
 Grand Prix d'Automne            -(1) Thousand Stars (2015)

 Australia
Ecycle Solutions Grand National Steeplechase -(1) Bashboy (2015)

 United States
 Grand National Hurdle Stakes      -(1) Rawnaq (2016)

 Japan
 Nakayama Grand Jump              -(1) Blackstairmountain (2013)

References

External links
Racing Post Profile

1979 births
Living people
Irish jockeys
Sportspeople from County Kildare
Lester Award winners